Pearson eCollege is an on-demand, or software as a service (SaaS), provider of eLearning software and services to secondary and post-secondary learning institutions and is owned by Pearson PLC. ECollege was founded in 1996 as Real Education, the company went public in 1999. as eCollege.com (NASDAQ: ECLG) and acquired by Pearson in 2007

See also
 History of virtual learning environments
 Virtual learning environment

References

External links
 eCollege

Education companies established in 1996
Educational software companies
Pearson plc
Virtual learning environments